The Y Selar Awards are awarded annually for the best Welsh language rock and pop music, by the Welsh language music magazine, Y Selar. The awards ceremony is the only one particularly for Welsh language music.

Background
The awards were first given out in 2010, in ten categories, with voting taking place via the Y Selar website, until the publication date of the March issue of the magazine.

Every February since 2014 the awards event has taken place at a 'live' event at Aberystwyth University, initially in front of an audience of 500, increasing to 700 in 2015. The organisers claimed an audience of 1,000 in February 2016.

Nominations are invited until December each year, for the twelve categories, from which a long list is chosen by the awards panel. A public vote then takes place using a Facebook app.

Winners

2013
Presented on 15 February 2014
 Best EP or Single - Du a Gwyn – Sŵnami
 Best Song - Anifail – Candelas
 Best Artwork - Llithro – Yr Ods
 Best Promoter - Nyth
 Best Music Presenter - Lisa Gwilym
 Best Solo Artist - Georgia Ruth Williams
 Best Live Event - Last Gig of Edward H Dafis, Denbigh National Eisteddfod
 Best Music Video - Gwreiddiau – Sŵnami
 Best LP - Candelas
 Best New Band or Artist - Kizzy Crawford
 Best Band - Candelas

2014
Presented on 21 February 2015
 Best EP or Single - Cynnydd / Gwenwyn – Sŵnami
 Best Song - Neb ar Ôl – Yws Gwynedd
 Best Artwork - Bodoli’n Ddistaw – Candelas
 Best Promoter - 4 a 6
 Best Music Presenter - Lisa Gwilym
 Best Solo Artist - Yws Gwynedd
 Best Live Event - Maes B, Llanelli National Eisteddfod
 Best Music Video - Gwenwyn – Sŵnami
 Best LP - Codi / Cysgu – Yws Gwynedd
 Best Musician - Lewis Williams (Sŵnami/Candelas)
 Best New Band or Artist - Ysgol Sul 
 Best Band - Candelas

2015
Presented on 20 February 2016
 Best EP or Single - Nôl ac Ymlaen – Calfari
 Best Song - Trwmgwsg – Sŵnami 
 Best Artwork - Sŵnami – Sŵnami
 Best Promoter - Maes B
 Best Music Presenter - Huw Stephens/Lisa Gwilym
 Best Solo Artist - Yws Gwynedd
 Best Live Event - Maes B
 Best Music Video - Sebona Fi – Yws Gwynedd
 Best LP - Sŵnami – Sŵnami
 Best Musician - Gwilym Bowen Rhys 
 Best New Band or Artist - Band Pres Llareggub 
 Best Band - Sŵnami
 Special Contribution Award - David R. Edwards

2016
Presented on 18 February 2017
 Best Song - Cyn i’r Lle Ma Gau – Y Bandana 
 Best Artwork - Fel Tôn Gron – Y Bandana
 Best Independent Promoter - Maes B
 Best Music Presenter - Lisa Gwilym
 Best Solo Artist - Yws Gwynedd
 Best Live Event - Maes B
 Best Music Video - Sgrîn – Yws Gwynedd
 Best LP - Fel Tôn Gron – Y Bandana
 Best EP or Single - Niwl – Ffracas
 Best New Band or Artist - Ffracas 
 Best Band - Y Bandana
 Best Instrumentalist - Osian Huw Williams
 Special Contribution Award - Geraint Jarman

2017
Presented on 17 February 2018
 Best Song - Drwy Dy Lygid Di – Yws Gwynedd 
 Best Artwork - Achw Met – Pasta Hull
 Best Independent Promoter - Clwb Ifor Bach
 Best Music Presenter - Tudur Owen
 Best Solo Artist - Alys Williams
 Best Live Event - Maes B
 Best Music Video - Drwy Dy Lygid Di – Yws Gwynedd
 Best LP - Anrheoli – Yws Gwynedd
 Best EP or Single - Cadno – Cadno
 Best New Band or Artist - Gwilym
 Best Band - Yws Gwynedd
 Best Instrumentalist - Osian Huw Williams
 Special Contribution Award - Heather Jones

2018
Presented on 16 February 2019.
 Best Song - Catalunya – Gwilym
 Best Artwork - Sugno Gola – Gwilym
 Best Independent Promoter - Clwb Ifor Bach
 Best Music Presenter - Tudur
 Best Solo Artist - Alys Williams
 Best Live Event - Maes B
 Best Music Video - Cwîn – Gwilym
 Best LP - Sugno Gola – Gwilym
 Best EP or Single - Croesa'r Afon – Trŵbz
 Best New Band or Artist - Lewys 
 Best Band - Gwilym
 Star of the Scene - Branwen Williams
 Special Contribution Award - Mark Roberts and Paul Jones

2019
Presented on 14/15 February 2020
 Best Song - \Neidia/ – Gwilym
 Best Artwork - Chawn Beans – Pasta Hull
 Best Independent Promoter - Clwb Ifor Bach
 Best Music Presenter - Tudur Owen
 Best Solo Artist - Elis Derby
 Best Live Event - Tafwyl
 Best Music Video - Gwalia – Gwilym
 Best LP - O Mi Awn Ni Am Dro – Fleur De Lys 
 Best EP or Single - Lle Yn Y Byd Mae Hyn? – Papur Wal
 Best New Band or Artist - Kim Hon 
 Best Band - Gwilym
 Star of the Scene - Yws Gwynedd
 Special Contribution Award - Gruff Rhys

2020 
Held between 8–11 February 2021 on BBC Radio Cymru mostly, because of the COVID-19 pandemic

 Star of the Scene - Mared 
 Best Artwork - Cofi 19
 Best New Band or Artist - Malan
 Best Solo Artist - Mared
 Best Song - 'Hel Sibrydion'– Lewys
 2020 Prize - Eädyth
 Best EP or Single - Dim ond Dieithryn – Lisa Pedrick
 Special Contribution Award  - Gwenno
 Best Music Video - Dos yn Dy Flaen – Bwncath
 Best Band – Bwncath
 Best LP - Bwncath II – Bwncath

2021 
Presented on 17 February 2022

 Best Song (Sponsored by PRS) - Llyn Llawenydd – Papur Wal
 New Band or Artist 2021 - Morgan Elwy 
 Star of the Scene 2021 - Marged Gwenllian
 Best Artwork (Sponsored by Y Lolfa) - Cashews Blasus – Y Cledrau
 Best Solo Artist - Mared
 2021 Prize (Sponsored by Heno) - Merched yn Gwneud Miwsig
 Best EP or Single (Sponsored by Dydd Miwsig Cymru) - Detholiad o Ganeuon Traddodiadol Gymreig – Los Blancos
 Best LP 2021 - Amser Mynd Adra – Papur Wal
 Special Contribution (Sponsored by University of Wales Trinity Saint David) - Tecwyn Ifan
 Best Music Video (Sponsored by S4C) - Theatr – Sŵnami
 Best Band - Papur Wal

2022 
Winners announced on Radio Cymru in February 2023:

 Best Song (Sponsored by PRS) - Eto – Adwaith
 New Band or Artist 2022 - Dom James and Lloyd
 Star of the Scene 2022 - Owain Williams (Klust)
 Best Artwork - Sŵnamii (album) – Sŵnami
 Best Solo Artist - Mared
 Best Short Record - Crescent – Thallo
 Best LP 2022 - Seren – Angharad Rhiannon
 2021 Prize - Izzy Rabey
 Special Contribution - Lisa Gwilym
 Best Music Video - Drama Queen – Tara Bandito
 Best Band - Adwaith

References

Pop music awards
Welsh-language music
Welsh music awards